First Comes First is The Paddingtons' debut album, released on 31 October 2005.
The Paddingtons are English Indie Rock band from Kingston Upon Hull.

Chart performance
The album reached No. 65 in the UK Albums Chart, in November 2005.

Singles
 "21/Some Old Girl", released in October 2004 it reached No. 47 in the UK Singles Chart.
 "Panic Attack", the second single from their debut album, was their highest-charting hit reaching No 25 in the UK Singles Chart.
 "50 to a Pound", their third single reached No. 32 in the UK Singles Chart, their second UK Top 40 single.
 "Sorry", reached No. 41 in the chart.

Track listing
"Some Old Girl"
"First Comes First"
"50 to a Pound"
"Worse For Wear"
"Loser"
"Panic Attack"
"Tommy's Disease"
"Stop Breathing"
"Alright in the Morning"
"21"
"Sleepdog"
"Sorry"

References

External links
The Paddingtons- Artist Profile NME

2005 albums
The Paddingtons albums
Albums produced by Owen Morris